Jonathan James Papik (born January 7, 1982) is an associate justice of the Nebraska Supreme Court.

Biography

Papik earned a Bachelor of Arts in history from University of Northwestern – St. Paul, graduating summa cum laude, and a Juris Doctor from Harvard Law School where he graduated magna cum laude. He clerked for then-Judge Neil Gorsuch of the United States Court of Appeals for the Tenth Circuit and Judge Laurence Silberman of the United States Court of Appeals for the District of Columbia Circuit. Papik was mentioned as a possible nominee for the United States Court of Appeals for the Eighth Circuit in 2017 for a vacant Nebraska seat but it ultimately went to Judge L. Steven Grasz.

Nebraska Supreme Court tenure

Papik's name was among those of four candidates that was submitted to the governor from a nominating commission.

On March 21, 2018 Nebraska Governor Pete Ricketts announced the appointment of Papik to the state Supreme Court. He fills the seat vacated due to the resignation of Judge Max J. Kelch.  This is Governor Ricketts’ fourth appointment to the Nebraska Supreme Court.

Personal life

Papik grew up in Stromsburg, Nebraska. He and his wife, Rachel, have three children. He is a registered Republican.

References

External links 
 

1982 births
Living people
21st-century American lawyers
21st-century American judges
Harvard Law School alumni
Nebraska lawyers
Nebraska Republicans
Justices of the Nebraska Supreme Court
People from Stromsburg, Nebraska
University of Northwestern – St. Paul alumni